Brooklawn is a borough in Camden County, in the U.S. state of New Jersey. As of the 2020 United States census, the borough's population was 1,815, a decrease of 140 (−7.2%) from the 2010 census count of 1,955, which in turn reflected  a decline of 399 (-16.9%) from the 2,354 counted in the 2000 Census, which had in turn increased by 549 (+30.4%) from the 1,805 counted in the 1990 Census.

Brooklawn was incorporated as a borough on March 11, 1924, from portions of the now-defunct Centre Township, based on the results of a referendum held on April 5, 1924. The borough was reincorporated on March 23, 1926. The borough's name is derived from its location and setting.

Geography
According to the U.S. Census Bureau, the borough had a total area of 0.53 square miles (1.37 km2), including 0.49 square miles (1.27 km2) of land and 0.04 square miles (0.11 km2) of water (7.74%).

The borough borders the municipalities of Bellmawr, Gloucester City, and Mount Ephraim in Camden County and Westville in Gloucester County.

Demographics

2010 census

The Census Bureau's 2006–2010 American Community Survey showed that (in 2010 inflation-adjusted dollars) median household income was $58,488 (with a margin of error of +/− $4,776) and the median family income was $62,390 (+/− $8,247). Males had a median income of $44,612 (+/− $6,912) versus $32,092 (+/− $20,049) for females. The per capita income for the borough was $26,154 (+/− $2,724). No families and 2.0% of the population were below the poverty line, including none of those under age 18 and 3.9% of those age 65 or over.

2000 census
As of the 2000 U.S. census, there were 2,354 people, 961 households, and 600 families residing in the borough. The racial makeup of the borough was 90.27% White, 4.29% African American, 0.08% Native American, 1.06% Asian, 2.38% from other races, and 1.91% from two or more races. Hispanic or Latino of any race were 4.72% of the population.

There were 961 households, out of which 32.8% had children under the age of 18 living with them, 41.8% were married couples living together, 16.4% had a female householder with no husband present, and 37.5% were non-families. 30.9% of all households were made up of individuals, and 12.7% had someone living alone who was 65 years of age or older. The average household size was 2.45 and the average family size was 3.09.

In the borough, the population was spread out, with 25.8% under the age of 18, 8.8% from 18 to 24, 32.3% from 25 to 44, 19.9% from 45 to 64, and 13.2% who were 65 years of age or older. The median age was 35 years. For every 100 females, there were 89.1 males. For every 100 females age 18 and over, there were 84.0 males.

The median income for a household in the borough was $39,600, and the median income for a family was $47,891. Males had a median income of $36,190 versus $26,591 for females. The per capita income for the borough was $18,295. About 6.1% of families and 7.3% of the population were below the poverty line, including 12.3% of those under age 18 and 4.0% of those age 65 or over.

Government

Local representation
Brooklawn is governed under the Borough form of New Jersey municipal government, which is used in 218 municipalities (of the 564) statewide, making it the most common form of government in New Jersey. The governing body is comprised of a Mayor and a Borough Council, with all positions elected at-large on a partisan basis as part of the November general election. A Mayor is elected directly by the voters to a four-year term of office. The Borough Council is comprised of six members elected to serve three-year terms on a staggered basis, with two seats coming up for election each year in a three-year cycle. The Borough form of government used by Bellmawr is a "weak mayor / strong council" government in which council members act as the legislative body with the mayor presiding at meetings and voting only in the event of a tie. The mayor can veto ordinances subject to an override by a two-thirds majority vote of the council. The mayor makes committee and liaison assignments for council members, and most appointments are made by the mayor with the advice and consent of the council.

, the Mayor of the Borough of Brooklawn is Democrat Theresa "Terri" Branella, whose term of office ends December 31, 2022. Members of the Brooklawn Borough Council are Council President Julie McCleary (D, 2024), John Clotworthy (D, 2022), Jerry "Skip" Granstrom (D, 2023), Patricia McConnell (D, 2024), Michael Mevoli (D, 2023) and Patrick Moses (D, 2022).

In September 2012, Patrick MacAdams was selected by the Borough Council from among a list of three prospective candidates nominated by the Democratic municipal committee to fill the unexpired seat of Rickie Boulden, who had resigned from office in June 2012.

Federal, state and county representation
Brooklawn is located in the 1st Congressional District and is part of New Jersey's 5th state legislative district.

Politics
As of March 2011, there were a total of 1,203 registered voters in Brooklawn, of which 512 (42.6% vs. 31.7% countywide) were registered as Democrats, 158 (13.1% vs. 21.1%) were registered as Republicans and 532 (44.2% vs. 47.1%) were registered as Unaffiliated. There was one voter registered to another party. Among the borough's 2010 Census population, 61.5% (vs. 57.1% in Camden County) were registered to vote, including 80.3% of those ages 18 and over (vs. 73.7% countywide).

In the 2012 presidential election, Democrat Barack Obama received 542 votes (65.9% vs. 54.8% countywide), ahead of Republican Mitt Romney with 266 votes (32.3% vs. 43.5%) and other candidates with 9 votes (1.1% vs. 0.9%), among the 823 ballots cast by the borough's 1,326 registered voters, for a turnout of 62.1% (vs. 70.4% in Camden County). In the 2008 presidential election, Democrat Barack Obama received 522 votes (59.1% vs. 66.2% countywide), ahead of Republican John McCain with 329 votes (37.3% vs. 30.7%) and other candidates with 14 votes (1.6% vs. 1.1%), among the 883 ballots cast by the borough's 1,249 registered voters, for a turnout of 70.7% (vs. 71.4% in Camden County). In the 2004 presidential election, Democrat John Kerry received 562 votes (61.5% vs. 61.7% countywide), ahead of Republican George W. Bush with 330 votes (36.1% vs. 36.4%) and other candidates with 12 votes (1.3% vs. 0.8%), among the 914 ballots cast by the borough's 1,211 registered voters, for a turnout of 75.5% (vs. 71.3% in the whole county).

In the 2013 gubernatorial election, Republican Chris Christie received 57.4% of the vote (263 cast), ahead of Democrat Barbara Buono with 40.0% (183 votes), and other candidates with 2.6% (12 votes), among the 472 ballots cast by the borough's 1,334 registered voters (14 ballots were spoiled), for a turnout of 35.4%. In the 2009 gubernatorial election, Democrat Jon Corzine received 242 ballots cast (46.4% vs. 53.8% countywide), ahead of Republican Chris Christie with 221 votes (42.3% vs. 38.5%), Independent Chris Daggett with 35 votes (6.7% vs. 4.5%) and other candidates with 15 votes (2.9% vs. 1.1%), among the 522 ballots cast by the borough's 1,213 registered voters, yielding a 43.0% turnout (vs. 40.8% in the county).

Education
The Brooklawn Public School District serves public school students in pre-kindergarten through eighth grade at Alice Costello School. As of the 2020–21 school year, the district, comprised of one school, had an enrollment of 286 students and 29.4 classroom teachers (on an FTE basis), for a student–teacher ratio of 9.7:1.

For ninth through twelfth grades, public school students attend Gloucester City Junior-Senior High School in Gloucester City as part of a sending/receiving relationship with the Gloucester City Public Schools. As of the 2020–21 school year, the high school had an enrollment of 587 students and 46.5 classroom teachers (on an FTE basis), for a student–teacher ratio of 12.6:1.

Students from Brooklawn, and from all of Camden County, are eligible to attend the Camden County Technical Schools, a countywide public school district that serves the vocational and technical education needs of students at the high school and post-secondary level at the Gloucester Township Campus in the Sicklerville section of Gloucester Township or the Pennsauken Camps in Pennsauken Township. Students are accepted based on district admission standards and costs of attendance and transportation are covered by the home district of each student.

Transportation

Roads and highways

U.S. Route 130 is the main highway serving Brooklawn. Additionally, Route 47 reaches its northern terminus in the borough. County Route 551 is the main county road serving Brooklawn.

Public transportation
NJ Transit bus service is available between the borough and Philadelphia on routes 401 (from Salem), 402 (from Pennsville Township), 408 (from Millville), 410 (from Bridgeton), and 412 (from Sewell).

Public safety
Brooklawn is protected by its own police force of approximately eight sworn police officers. Brooklawn also has its own fire company that serves the community with approximately six certified firefighters and eight junior firefighters. The fire company operates two Class A pumpers, a brush truck, a mobile cascade system, a special operations trailer, three boats, two antique fire engines (one of which is non-operational), and a command vehicle. Also housed in the borough-owned buildings are two canteen units used to deliver food to fire scenes that belong to the Camden County Fireman's Association. The fire company operates out of three buildings, of which two are located on the east side of town and one on the west side Brooklawn. The borough has entered a shared service agreement with the Borough of Bellmawr to provide ambulance service for Brooklawn, after shutting down the borough's volunteer ambulance due to lack of attendance on calls.

References

External links

 Borough of Brooklawn
 Brooklawn Public School District
 
 School Data for the Brooklawn Public School District, National Center for Education Statistics

 
1924 establishments in New Jersey
Borough form of New Jersey government
Boroughs in Camden County, New Jersey
Populated places established in 1924
New Jersey populated places on the Delaware River